Simon Svabic (born 18 January 1980) is a Serbian-British former professional rugby league footballer.

He used to play for Salford, Leigh Centurions (Heritage No. 1173), Oldham RLFC (Heritage No. 1134), Rochdale Hornets and the Blackpool Panthers in the Championship One, usually as a goal-kicking .

References

External links
 http://www.blackpoolpanthers-rlfc.co.uk/index.php?option=com_content&view=article&id=71:&catid=41:players&Itemid=68

1980 births
Living people
Blackpool Panthers players
English people of Serbian descent
English rugby league players
Leigh Leopards players
Oldham R.L.F.C. players
Rochdale Hornets players
Rugby articles needing expert attention
Salford Red Devils players